Ngourkosso is one of four departments in Logone Occidental, a region of Chad. Its capital is Benoyé.

Departments of Chad
Logone Occidental Region